Babaji Singh Khalsa (August 15, 1947 – November 19, 2006) was a Mexican Sikh who is credited for translating Guru Granth Sahib, the holy text of the Sikhs into Spanish.

Life
He was born in Mexico City; raised in a Catholic family, he finished his studies in a Jesuit University in Mexico, Universidad Iberoamericana. After finishing college, he left for Alaska and then United States of America. Soon, after converting to Sikhism, he returned to Mexico City, Mexico and became a Sikh preacher.

He translated the Guru Granth Sahib into Spanish, which took him 30 years, with help from the English translation of the scripture by Gopal Singh. The translation was presented by his widow, Guru Amrit Kaur in October 2008, in Nanded, during the Tercentenary Celebrations of the Guru Gaddi of Guru Granth Sahib.

See also
 Sikhism
 Guru Granth Sahib
 Yogi Bhajan
 Spanish language

References

1947 births
2006 deaths
20th-century translators
Converts to Sikhism
Former Roman Catholics
Mexican people of Indian descent
Mexican Sikhs
Mexican translators
People from Mexico City
Sikh missionaries
Translators to Spanish
Missionary linguists